Vivid TV is a British English language Category B pay TV adult entertainment television channel consisting of primarily softcore adult content in the form of films, documentaries, reality shows, and variety shows, among others, between 6:00am to 11:00pm EST, while hardcore content, primarily from Vivid Entertainment, fills the remainder of the schedule. The channel is owned by Redlight TV

The channel also planned to launch in Austria.

History
VividTV Europe launched by Redlight TV, a European adult television and will be led by Tony Cochi, EVP worldwide distribution of VividTV, and Stephen E. Walter, SVP of business development for Canada and Europe.

Bill Asher, co-chairman of Vivid Entertainment, said distribution deals with several major European operators will be announced shortly.

European viewers can now watch celebrity sex tapes and also pornographic-themed superhero parodies.

VividTV Europe will be available on Astra 1L 19.2 degrees East as well as via fibre and also available in video-on-demand services.

References

External links
 
 Vivid-On-Demand 24/7 Commercial

British pornographic television channels
Pornographic television channels